Full Blown Entertainment is a music production and songwriting company based in the Caribbean twin-island of Trinidad & Tobago. They are responsible for the songwriting or production of songs for a variety of artistes including Boyz II Men, Machel Montano, 2face Idibia, Kes The Band and Kerwin Dubois.

History

Having no formal musical training, Kevon and Kory Hart were introduced to the process of composing music digitally in the year 2004 through a former school mate. In the years to follow, the duo would hone their songwriting and production skills in a variety of genres, especially R&B, EDM and Soca music. Countless demos would be recorded and visits to studios made in an attempt to display their talents and shop their material. This was a lot more difficult than they had imagined, as none of the producers, managers and vocalists they met seemed to believe in what they had to offer.

It would be after approximately six years that in 2011 the company forced its first door open. In one studio session while recording a song for a wedding, their writing ability and sense of melody was noticed by Kasey Phillips of Precision Productions. After the recording was done, Phillips approached the duo and enquired whether they would be willing to write Soca music for the upcoming Carnival celebrations. After initially turning down the offer, they accepted a compact disc with some instrumentals composed by Precision Productions. Coming out of this was the very first song they shopped; Machel Montano's Vibes Cyah Done, which turned out to be a hit single. Stemming from this, Machel requested a meeting with Full Blown.

Songwriting/production career

2012: career beginnings

In 2012, FBE shot out of the blocks and took the world of Soca Music by storm. Their work sounded like nothing anyone had heard before. So unique was their style that they were able to place thirteen songs within the space of only a couple months. Their mix of melody and rhythm undoubtedly saw the beginning of the Groovy Soca songs overtaking the hype and popularity of the fast-paced Power Soca songs. Not only did they write the majority of the most popular songs for Trinidad Carnival but two of their songs eventually placed 1st and 3rd in the International Groovy Soca Monarch Competition; Machel Montano's Mr. Fete and Benjai's People's Champion respectively. The Mr. Fete final performance was the brainchild of both Arvinder Rampersad and legendary artist and "mas-man" Peter Minshall. This would be Machel's very first Groovy Soca Monarch title.

FBE's achievements were coupled with the fact that Machel Montano's Vibes Cyah Done and Mr. Fete songs were both to be released as singles under the umbrella of record company Universal Music, France. Vibes Cyah Done was released and featured Guadeloupe artiste and label mate Admiral T while Mr.Fete remix was released featuring another Guadeloupe artiste and label mate Matt Houston and Kulu G.

2013: sophomore year

In the year 2013, the high standard that FBE became known for was indeed maintained. For a second year in a row, they would capture the International Groovy Soca Monarch Competition title with Machel Montano's song entitled FOG. The finals performance was also choreographed by FBE and Machel Montano. Machel's both Groovy Soca Monarch awards were therefore written by FBE.

A song rich in imagery and melody, truly capturing the vibe and emotion of different aspects of Carnival. The FOG was heard on a Canadian radio station by well known DJ Grandtheft, which lead to a remix being made with the collaborative efforts of Grandtheft and Major Lazer.

2014: the threepeat

Once again, Full Blown Entertainment were able to capture the International Soca Monarch title in the Groovy category, completing their hattrick. Kerwin Dubois' song entitled 'Too Real' was this time the favorite of both judges and fans alike. This set the stage for FBE to expand with the addition of a new member; Aaron St.Louis who was also a co-writer of 'Too Real'. FBE managed to help pull off an upset in which artiste Kerwin DuBois entered the competition as the underdog and eventually dethroned the "King of Soca" Machel Montano himself. This title came full circle for Du Bois as he had previously won it in the year 2011 as a songwriter and producer for the winning song entitled 'Wotless' which was performed by Kees Dieffenthaller.
Assisted by the choreography of Step Up Revolution's Jamaal Sims, the performance was a clear winner even before the final note was sung.

2015: four in a row

For the fourth consecutive year, FBE had penned the song that would dominate the airwaves and all the events of Trinidad Carnival. Contributing to both the music production and songwriting just as they did in the previous year, they teamed up with Roc Nation's star producer Deputy as well as Machel Montano and London Future. The brass-driven composition turned out to be their fourth title winning song, capturing the 2015 International Power Soca Monarch title as well as the 2015 Road March title for the song most played during the Carnival parade.

Carnival 2015 - present

Even with all their local and regional success in mind, this young group of composers are of the firm opinion that they are yet to achieve their goals. They are determined to expand their audience to a global level and to take their unique blend of influences wherever their musical journey takes them. With their watchwords of Humility, Respect, Loyalty and Love, they set their sights on leaving the FBE stamp on world music. Currently, FBE is engaged in a number of projects outside of the Soca genre. After their songwriting and production for the likes of Boyz II Men, they have had the opportunity to work with the very talented songwriter and musician Claude Kelly. Another great achievement includes their songwriting for Nigerian vocalist 2face Idibia with his recently released single entitled 'Go' featuring Machel Montano on his latest album The Ascension.

FBE is presently at work, composing music for the upcoming 2016 Trinidad Carnival, working with selected artistes such as Kes The Band, Machel Montano, Kerwin DuBois and Lyrikal.

Discography

References

External links
Trinidad Express Newspaper Article
|publisher= When Steel Talks Article
Triple The Focus e-Magazine

Record production teams